Hector William "Harry" Cording (26 April 1891 – 1 September 1954) was an English-American actor. He is perhaps best remembered for his roles in the films The Black Cat (1934) and The Adventures of Robin Hood (1938).

Life and career 
Cording was born Hector William Cording on 26 April 1891 in Wellington, Somerset. He was brought up and was educated at Rugby, and he was a member of the English Army in World War I. In 1919, he became steward for a British steamship line whose ships, such as the Vauban and the Calamares, which he had worked on, frequently called at the Port of New York. After a number of trips, he resigned and decided to stay in the United States.  He later settled permanently in Los Angeles, where he began a film career. His first role was as a henchman in The Knockout (1925), followed by similar roles over the next few years. Cording appeared in many Hollywood films from the 1920s to the 1950s. With an imposing six-foot height, stocky build, and perhaps due to his uncomfortable resemblance to veteran film bad guy Oskar Homolka, "Harry the Henchman" usually portrayed thugs, villains' henchmen and policemen.

Cording's most notable roles were probably as the villainous Dickon Malbete, Captain of the Guard in Errol Flynn's Adventures of Robin Hood and as Thamal, the hulking henchman to Bela Lugosi's character in 1934's Black Cat. As a contract player at Universal Pictures in the 1940s, he turned up in tiny parts in many of their horror films, such as The Wolf Man.

Having appeared in a bit role in 20th Century-Fox's Adventures of Sherlock Holmes starring Basil Rathbone (1939), he went on to appear in supporting and bit parts in seven of the twelve Universal Studios Sherlock Holmes films in which Rathbone starred.

Cording died on 1 September 1954. The cause of death was not documented. His wife was Margaret Cording, née Fiero, (1912–91), a native of Michigan; their daughter, Margaret Rose, was born on 7 November 1939. The Cordings lived at 4104 Farmdale Avenue, North Hollywood. Harry Cording was an active member of the Loyal Order of Moose fraternity.

Cording is buried in Glen Haven Memorial Park in Sylmar, California.

Filmography

 The Shock Punch (1925) - Construction Site Security Guard (uncredited) (film debut)
 The Knockout (1925) - Steve McKenna
 Black Jack (1927) - Haskins
 Turkish Delight (1927) - (uncredited)
 Daredevil's Reward (1928) - Second Heavy
 The Last Command (1928) - Revolutionist (uncredited)
 Four Sons (1928) - (uncredited)
 Feel My Pulse (1928) - Rum-Running Boatman (uncredited)
 The Patriot (1928) - Stefan
 Sins of the Fathers (1928) - The Hijacker
 The Rescue (1929) - Belarab
 The Squall (1929) - Peter
 The Isle of Lost Ships (1929) - Gallagher
 Christina (1929) - Dick Torpe
 Captain of the Guard (1930) - Le Bruin
 Bride of the Regiment (1930) - Sgt. Dostal
 Women Everywhere (1930) - Legionnaire in Cafe (uncredited)
 Rough Romance (1930) - Chick Carson
 New Moon (1930) - Kirghiz Soldier at Fort Darvaz (uncredited)
 The Right of Way (1931) - Rouge's Henchman (uncredited)
 The Conquering Horde (1931) - Butch Daggett
 I Like Your Nerve (1931) - San Arango Officer (uncredited)
 Honor of the Family (1931) - Kouski
 The Sea Ghost (1931) - Sailor Who Knocks Out Capt. Winter (uncredited)
 Over the Hill (1931) - Townsman (uncredited)
 Mata Hari (1931) - Ivan (uncredited)
 Night Beat (1931) - Chill Scarpelli
 Texas Cyclone (1932) - Jake Farwell
 The World and the Flesh (1932) - Ivanovitch
 Forgotten Commandments (1932) - Officer (uncredited)
 Merrily We Go to Hell (1932) - Fred - Bartender (uncredited)
 My Pal, the King (1932) - Palace Guard (uncredited)
 Fighting for Justice (1932) - Henchman (uncredited)
 The Cabin in the Cotton (1932) - Ross Clinton (uncredited)
 The Face on the Barroom Floor (1932) - Steve the Doorman (uncredited)
 Scarlet Dawn (1932) - Revolutionary (uncredited)
 Secrets of the French Police (1932) - Man Reading Newspaper (uncredited)
 File 113 (1933) - Michele
 Tonight Is Ours (1933) - Assassin #1 (uncredited)
 The Intruder (1933) - Cramer
 Sweepings (1933) - Customer (uncredited)
 Trick for Trick (1933) - Dredger (uncredited)
 The Girl in 419 (1933) - Henchman Driver (uncredited)
 The Man Who Dared (1933) - Coal Mine Boss (uncredited)
 Captured! (1933) - First Orderly
 Narcotic (1933) - Dr. William G. Davis
 To the Last Man (1933) - Colby Man Fred (uncredited)
 Roman Scandals (1933) - Valerius' Soldier (uncredited)
 The House of Rothschild (1934) - Man in 1780 Sequence (uncredited)
 Viva Villa! (1934) - Majordomo (uncredited)
 The Black Cat (1934) - Thamal
 The Count of Monte Cristo (1934) - Jailer (uncredited)
 Treasure Island (1934) - Henry - Pirate (uncredited)
 Great Expectations (1934) - Orlick
 We Live Again (1934) - Jailer (uncredited)
 Strange Wives (1934) - Tribesman
 The Man Who Reclaimed His Head (1934) - French Mechanic (uncredited)
 The Lives of a Bengal Lancer (1935) - Sentry (uncredited)
 Charlie Chan in Paris (1935) - Gendarme Arresting Yvette (uncredited)
 The Mystery of Edwin Drood (1935) - Turke - Opium Addict (uncredited)
 Naughty Marietta (1935) - Pirate (uncredited)
 Les Misérables (1935) - Beam Warder (uncredited)
 Black Fury (1935) - Louie - a Miner (uncredited)
 Lady Tubbs (1935) - Polack (uncredited)
 The Crusades (1935) - Amir (uncredited)
 Anna Karenina (1935) - Officer at Banquet (uncredited)
 Ladies Love Danger (1935) - Stagehand (uncredited)
 Peter Ibbetson (1935) - Guard (uncredited)
 Mutiny on the Bounty (1935) - Soldier (uncredited)
 Ship Cafe (1935) - Stoker (uncredited)
 Captain Blood (1935) - Kent
 Riffraff (1936) - Joe - Agitator (uncredited)
 Road Gang (1936) - Sam Dawson
 Sutter's Gold (1936) - Seaman Lars (uncredited)
 The Country Doctor (1936) - Logger (uncredited)
 The White Angel (1936) - Hospital Storekeeper (uncredited)
 Suzy (1936) - Madame Eyrelle's Chauffeur (uncredited)
 The Last of the Mohicans (1936) - Trapper (uncredited)
 The Magnificent Brute (1936) - Customer Demetrios (uncredited)
 Daniel Boone (1936) - Joe Burch
 You Only Live Once (1937) - Guard (uncredited)
 Maid of Salem (1937) - Guard (uncredited)
 Sea Devils (1937) - Sailor (uncredited)
 The Soldier and the Lady (1937) - Peasant (uncredited)
 The Prince and the Pauper (1937) - Second Guard
 The Road Back (1937) - Attendant (uncredited)
 Fit for a King (1937) - Thug (uncredited)
 Conquest (1937) - Cossack (uncredited)
 The Adventures of Marco Polo (1938) - Kaidu Officer (uncredited)
 Crime School (1938) - Jim - the Second Guard (uncredited)
 The Adventures of Robin Hood (1938) - Dickon Malbete
 Marie Antoinette (1938) - Executioner (uncredited)
 Painted Desert (1938) - Henchman Burke
 Valley of the Giants (1938) - Greer
 Heart of the North (1938) - Miner Leading Mob (uncredited)
 A Christmas Carol (1938) - Waiter (uncredited)
 Stand Up and Fight (1939) - Bullet Line Blacksmith (uncredited)
 Devil's Island (1939) - Guard Accepting Bribe (uncredited)
 Son of Frankenstein (1939) - Bearded Gendarme (uncredited)
 Arizona Legion (1939) - Whiskey Joe
 The Adventures of Huckleberry Finn (1939) - Man Stealing Watermelon (uncredited)
 North of the Yukon (1939) - MacGregor
 Racketeers of the Range (1939) - Scarface Pete (uncredited)
 The Sun Never Sets (1939) - Zurof Camp Guard (uncredited)
 Each Dawn I Die (1939) - Temple
 Mutiny on the Blackhawk (1939) - Bos'un (uncredited)
 The Adventures of Sherlock Holmes (1939) - Cragin (uncredited)
 Outpost of the Mounties (1939) - Trapper Mac (uncredited)
 The Marshal of Mesa City (1939) - Bat Cardigan - Henchman
 Rulers of the Sea (1939) - Seaman (uncredited)
 Tower of London (1939) - Lead Murderer of the Children (uncredited)
 We Are Not Alone (1939) - Man Carrying Leni (uncredited)
 Destry Rides Again (1939) - Creepy - Lends Tom Guns (uncredited)
 The Light That Failed (1939) - Soldier (uncredited)
 The Hunchback of Notre Dame (1939) - Guard (uncredited)
 The Invisible Man Returns (1940) - Miner Saying 'Keep the Wig on Willie' (uncredited)
 The Grapes of Wrath (1940) - Deputy (uncredited)
 Little Old New York (1940) - Man in Mob About to Set 'Clermont' Afire (uncredited)
 The House of the Seven Gables (1940) - Blacksmith Hawkins (uncredited)
 Strange Cargo (1940) - Guard (uncredited)
 Virginia City (1940) - Scarecrow - Union Prisoner at Libby (uncredited)
 Dark Command (1940) - Angry Townsman in Bank (uncredited)
 Texas Stagecoach (1940) - Clancy
 Florian (1940) - Leader (uncredited)
 Passport to Alcatraz (1940) - Jeffers
 The Sea Hawk (1940) - Slavemaster
 When the Daltons Rode (1940) - Rigby Henchman (uncredited)
 Stage to Chino (1940) - Pete - Henchman
 King of the Royal Mounted (1940, Serial) - Wade Garson
 A Dispatch from Reuters (1940) - Sailor on the Nova Scotian (uncredited)
 Law and Order (1940) - Poe Daggett
 Trail of the Vigilantes (1940) - Phil
 The Great Plane Robbery (1940) - Eddie Lindo
 Santa Fe Trail (1940) - Workman in Delaware Crossing (uncredited)
 The Green Hornet Strikes Again! (1940, Serial) - Dannick - Crooked Construction Foreman (uncredited)
 The San Francisco Docks (1940) - Collins (uncredited)
 So Ends Our Night (1941) - Card Player (uncredited)
 Rage in Heaven (1941) - Workers' Delegate #1 (uncredited)
 Back in the Saddle (1941) - Brawler (uncredited)
 Bury Me Not on the Prairie (1941) - J. L. Red Clinton
 The Lady from Cheyenne (1941) - Mike, Cork's Henchman (uncredited)
 Mutiny in the Arctic (1941) - Harmon
 Singapore Woman (1941) - Crow's Nest Manager (uncredited)
 They Met in Bombay (1941) - Corporal at Base (uncredited)
 Raiders of the Desert (1941) - Rawlins
 Rawhide Rangers (1941) - Blackie
 Badlands of Dakota (1941) - Jackson (uncredited)
 Lydia (1941) - Hotel House Detective (uncredited)
 The Wolf Man (1941) - Wykes (uncredited)
 Riders of the Badlands (1941) - Higgins
 Son of Fury: The Story of Benjamin Blake (1942) - Turnkey (uncredited)
 Wild Bill Hickok Rides (1942) - Saloon Bouncer (uncredited)
 Ride 'Em Cowboy (1942) - Poker Player (uncredited)
 The Ghost of Frankenstein (1942) - Frone (uncredited)
 The Spoilers (1942) - Miner (uncredited)
 The Voice of Terror (1942) - Camberwell - Basement Dive Patron (uncredited)
 Overland Mail (1942) - Sam Gregg - Henchman
 A Yank at Eton (1942) - Bartender (uncredited)
 The Mummy's Tomb (1942) - Vic - Farmer (uncredited)
 Road to Morocco (1942) - Warrior (uncredited)
 Pittsburgh (1942) - Miner (uncredited)
 Sherlock Holmes and the Secret Weapon (1942) - Jack Brady (uncredited)
 Arabian Nights (1942) - Blacksmith
 Tennessee Johnson (1942) - Captain McGruder (uncredited)
 Chetniks! The Fighting Guerrillas (1943) - German Sergeant (uncredited)
 The Moon Is Down (1943) - Albert - Miner (uncredited)
 Mission to Moscow (1943) - Blacksmith (uncredited)
 Two Tickets to London (1943) - Sutliff (uncredited)
 Fugitive from Sonora (1943) - Iron Joe Martin
 For Whom the Bell Tolls (1943) - Man Who Flails the Mayor (uncredited)
 The Man from Down Under (1943) - Bettor (uncredited)
 The Man from the Rio Grande (1943) - John King
 There's Something About a Soldier (1943) - Jan's Friend (uncredited)
 The Spider Woman (1943) - Fred Garvin - Henchman on Roof (uncredited)
 Klondike Kate (1943) - Irate Miner Gambler (uncredited)
 The Song of Bernadette (1943) - Stonemason (uncredited)
 Ali Baba and the Forty Thieves (1944) - Mahmoud
 The Impostor (1944) - Freighter Captain (uncredited)
 Phantom Lady (1944) - Courtroom Spectator Next to Carol (uncredited)
 Passage to Marseille (1944) - Chief Guard (uncredited)
 The Great Alaskan Mystery (1944, Serial) - Captain Greeder [Chs. 1-3]
 The Hour Before the Dawn (1944) - Sam (uncredited)
 The Pearl of Death (1944) - George Gelder (uncredited)
 Gypsy Wildcat (1944) - Captain Marver
 Kismet (1944) - Policeman (uncredited)
 An American Romance (1944) - Workman in Meeting (uncredited)
 Mrs. Parkington (1944) - Humphrey
 Lost in a Harem (1944) - Police Chief (uncredited)
 Bluebeard (1944) - Policeman (uncredited)
 The Man in Half Moon Street (1945) - First Bobby (uncredited)
 Jungle Queen (1945, Serial) - Husky Deck Sailor (uncredited)
 The House of Fear (1945) - John Simpson
 Sudan (1945) - Uba
 The Fatal Witness (1945) - Gus, pubkeeper
 Confidential Agent (1945) - Rugged 'Detective' (uncredited)
 Captain Kidd (1945) - Newgate Prison Warder (uncredited)
 San Antonio (1945) - Hawker (uncredited)
 The Fighting Guardsman (1946) - Tax Collector (uncredited)
 Terror by Night (1946) - Mock the coffin maker (uncredited)
 The Bandit of Sherwood Forest (1946) - Prioress Guard (uncredited)
 Devotion (1946) - Coachman with Frightened Horses (uncredited)
 Night in Paradise (1946) - Captain (uncredited)
 Dressed to Kill (1946) - Hamid
 Inside Job (1946) - Bartender (uncredited)
 Hot Cargo (1946) - Matt Wayne
 The Verdict (1946) - Tough Englishman (uncredited)
 Renegade Girl (1946) - Miller
 Fool's Gold (1946) - Henchman Duke
 California (1947) - Miner (uncredited)
 Calcutta (1947) - Tea Planter (uncredited)
 The Imperfect Lady (1947) - Policeman (uncredited)
 Dangerous Venture (1947) - Dan Morgan
 The Marauders (1947) - Riker
 Slave Girl (1947) - Guard Captain (uncredited)
 Unconquered (1947) - Garth's Marksman (uncredited)
 The Exile (1947) - Roundhead (uncredited)
 Forever Amber (1947) - Minor Role (uncredited)
 Trail of the Mounties (1947) - Trapper Hawkins
 The Swordsman (1948) - Blacksmith (uncredited)
 A Woman's Vengeance (1948) - Chauffeur McNabb
 The Black Arrow (1948) - Guard (uncredited)
 Dangers of the Canadian Mounted (1948) - Track Heavy #2 (uncredited)
 13 Lead Soldiers (1948) - Edward Vane
 Tap Roots (1948) - Leader (uncredited)
 A Southern Yankee (1948) - Guerrilla Horseman (uncredited)
 That Lady in Ermine (1948) - Orlando - Ancestor (uncredited)
 Red River (1948) - Gambler (uncredited)
 Kiss the Blood Off My Hands (1948) - Policeman (uncredited)
 Bad Men of Tombstone (1949) - Miner (uncredited)
 The Fighting O'Flynn (1949) - Pat
 Lust for Gold (1949) - Joe (uncredited)
 The Secret of St. Ives (1949) - Innkeeper (uncredited)
 Rope of Sand (1949) - Guard (uncredited)
 Challenge to Lassie (1949) - Adam, the Blacksmith (uncredited)
 Samson and Delilah (1949) - Prince (uncredited)
 Tyrant of the Sea (1950) - Sampson Edwards - Sailor
 Buccaneer's Girl (1950) - Man in Pub (uncredited)
 Cargo to Capetown (1950) - Engine Room Oiler (uncredited)
 Fortunes of Captain Blood (1950) - Will Ward
 Rogues of Sherwood Forest (1950) - Officer Posting Decree (uncredited)
 Convicted (1950) - Convict in Prison Yard (uncredited)
 Indian Territory (1950) - Soldier (uncredited)
 Copper Canyon (1950) - Miner (uncredited)
 Last of the Buccaneers (1950) - Sailor Cragg Brown
 Al Jennings of Oklahoma (1951) - Mike Bridges
 Up Front (1951) - Minor Role 
 Santa Fe (1951) - Moose Legrande
 Sirocco (1951) - Master Sergeant (uncredited)
 Mask of the Avenger (1951) - Zio d'Orsini
 Iron Man (1951) - Miner (uncredited)
 The Strange Door (1951) - Guard (uncredited)
 The Big Trees (1952) - Cleve Gregg
 Night Stage to Galveston (1952) - Ted Driscoll
 The San Francisco Story (1952) - Card Player (uncredited)
 Brave Warrior (1952) - Shayne MacGregor
 Cripple Creek (1952) - Miner Hibbs (uncredited)
 Ma and Pa Kettle at the Fair (1952) - Ed (uncredited)
 Captain Pirate (1952) - Col. Ramsey's Overseer (uncredited)
 Plymouth Adventure (1952) - Aide to Head Constable (uncredited)
 Road to Bali (1952) - Verna's Father (uncredited)
 Against All Flags (1952) - Gow
 Androcles and the Lion (1952) - Soldier (uncredited)
 Treasure of the Golden Condor (1953) - Breton (uncredited)
 Rogue's March (1953) - Fish Cleaner (uncredited)
 Titanic (1953) - Boiler Room Engineer (uncredited)
 Ambush at Tomahawk Gap (1953) - Stableman (uncredited)
 Law and Order (1953) - Townsman (uncredited)
 Abbott and Costello Meet Dr. Jekyll and Mr. Hyde (1953) - Rough Character in Park (uncredited)
 Here Come the Girls (1953) - Laundry Facility Engineer (uncredited)
 Man in the Attic (1953) - Detective Sgt. Bates
 Demetrius and the Gladiators (1954)  - Guard-Escort of Prisoners (uncredited)
 King Richard and the Crusaders (1954) - Castelaine Spokesman (uncredited)
 Killer Leopard (1954) - Supt. Saunders (uncredited)
 The Black Shield of Falworth (1954) - Captain of King's Guards (uncredited)
 Down Three Dark Streets (1954) - Man Getting Rubdown (uncredited)
 Jungle Gents (1954) - Dan Shanks
 East of Eden (1955) - Bouncer (uncredited) (final film role)

References

External links
 
 
 

1891 births
1954 deaths
American male film actors
20th-century American male actors
British emigrants to the United States